Vāyu-Vāta or Vāta-Vāyu is the Avestan language name of a dual-natured Zoroastrian divinity of the wind (Vayu) and of the atmosphere (Vata). The names are also used independently of one another, with 'Vayu' occurring more frequently than 'Vata', but even when used independently still representing the other aspect.

The entity is simultaneously angelic and demonic, that is, depending on the circumstances, either yazata - "worthy of worship" - or daeva, which in Zoroastrian tradition is a demon. Scripture frequently applies the epithet "good" when speaking of one or the other in a positive context.

In Zurvanism (Zurvanite Zoroastrianism, a now-extinct form of Zoroastrianism), Vata-Vayu represented two facets of the quaternary Zurvan. In this arrangement, Vata-Vayu represented "space" while the other two facets represent "time."

Vayu-Vata has Indo-Iranian roots, and has the same name in historical Vedic religion.

In Sanskrit and Hinduism 
Both the words Vāta and Vāyu have almost identical meanings in Sanskrit or Vedic traditions. Although there is no god representing Vata, there is the god Vayu representing air. The word Vata is still used today in many Indian languages to denote atmosphere. Atmosphere in Hindi, Marathi etc., is called Vatavaran (वातावरण). which is made of two words Vata meaning Air, Avaran (आवरण) meaning layer.

References

 

Wind deities
Yazatas
Ancient Iranian gods

sv:Vata